Zanetti is a surname of Italian origin. Notable people with the surname include:

Adriana Serra Zanetti (born 1976), Italian professional tennis player
Aheda Zanetti (born 1967), Lebanese-born Australian fashion designer
Antonella Serra Zanetti (born 1980), Italian professional tennis player
Antonio Zanetti (1754–1812), Italian painter
Antonio Maria Zanetti (1679–1767), Venetian art critic, connoisseur and collector
 Antonio Maria Zanetti (the younger) (1706–1778), Venetian art historian and custodian of the Marciana Library
Arthur Zanetti (born 1990), Brazilian athlete
Cristiano Zanetti (born 1977), Italian professional football player
Denis Zanette (1970–2003), Italian professional racing cyclist
Enrico Zanetti (born 1973), Italian politician and tax advisor
Eugenio Zanetti (born 1949), Argentine dramatist, painter, film set designer, and theater and opera director
Gasparo Zanetti (after 1600–1660), Italian violin teacher and composer
Giacomo Zanetti (1696–1735), Italian master builder and architect
Gianluca Zanetti (born 1977), Italian professional football player
Giuseppe Miti Zanetti (1859–1929), Italian painter and engraver
Gregory Zanetti, (contemporary), United States Army general officer
Javier Zanetti (born 1973), Argentine professional football player
José Vela Zanetti (1913–1999), Spanish painter and muralist
Leopoldina Zanetti Borzino (1826–1902), Italian painter and printmaker
Lorenzo Zanetti (born 1987), Italian motorcycle racer
Marco Zanetti (born 1962), Italian professional billiards player
Massimo Zanetti (born 1948), Italian ormer politician, owner of Segafredo
Mauro Zanetti (born 1973), former Italian cyclist
Michela Zanetti (born 1991), Italian football forward
Monique Zanetti (born 1961), French soprano
Paolo Zanetti (born 1982), Italian professional football player
Paul Zanette (born 1988), Italian-Canadian hockey player
Paul Zanetti (born 1961), Australian political cartoonist
Paulo Zanetti (born 1952), former international freestyle swimmer from Brazil
Rebecca Zanetti, New York Times and USA Today bestselling author of paranormal romance
Roberto Zanetti (born 1956), Italian singer and music producer
Rosanna Zanetti (born 1988), Venezuelan actress
Sebastiano Zanetti, Italian coxswain and medalist
Sergio Zanetti (born 1967), Argentine professional football player
Sol Zanetti (born 1982), Canadian politician and Representative of Quebec
Tom Zanetti (born 1989), English musician
Veronique Zanetti (born 1959), German professor of Political Philosophy
Vittore Zanetti Zilla (1864–1946), talian painter

 Fictional characters
Bubba Zanetti, fictional character of Mad Max, 1979 Australian dystopian action film directed by George Miller

Italian-language surnames